Sergei Nikiforovich Vasilenko (Sergej Nikiforovič Vasilenko;  – 11 March 1956) was a Russian and Soviet composer, conductor and music teacher whose compositions showed a strong tendency towards mysticism.

Vasilenko was born in Moscow and originally studied law at Moscow State University, but then changed direction and studied at the Moscow Conservatory from 1896 to 1901 as a pupil of Sergei Taneyev and Mikhail Ippolitov-Ivanov. From 1903 to 1904 he was the conductor of a private opera house in Moscow. For several years he was the organiser and conductor of the Historic Concerts of the Russian Musical Society. He then became a Professor at the Moscow Conservatory, where his students included Aram Khachaturian, Nikolai Roslavets, Nikolai Rakov and Aarre Merikanto. 

Vasilenko was awarded two Orders of the Red Banner of Labour as well as the title People's Artist of the RSFSR. In 1947, he was awarded the Stalin Prize. He died in Moscow in 1956.

Selected works

Opera
Skazaniye o grade velikom Kitezhe i tikhom ozere Svetoyare (Tale of the Great City of Kitezh and the Quiet Lake Svetoyar) (1902; originally a cantata, Op. 5)
Sïn solntsa (The Son of the Sun), Op. 63 (1929) 
Khristofor Kolumb (Christopher Columbus), Op. 80 (1933) 
Buran (The Snow Storm), Op. 98 (1939)
Velikiy kanal (The Grand Canal), Op. 101 (1939) 
Suvorov, Op. 102 (1942)

Ballet
In the Rays of the Sun, Op. 17 (1925–26)
Noya, Op. 42 (1923)
Joseph the Handsome, Op. 50 (1925)
Lola, Op. 52 (1926)
The Gypsies, Op. 90 (1936; after Alexander Pushkin)
The Frog Princess, Op. 103 (1941)
Mirandolina

Choral
Cantata Legend of the Great City of Kitezh and the Quiet Lake Svetoyar, Op, 5 (later turned into an opera that anticipated Nikolai Rimsky-Korsakov's work on the same subject)
Cantata for the 20th Anniversary of the October Revolution, Op. 92 (1937)

Incidental music
Euripides' Alcestis (written as a schoolboy)
other works

Orchestral
Three Bloody Battles, Op. 1 (1900)
Epic Poem, Op. 4 (1900–03)
Symphony No. 1 in G minor, Op. 10 (1904–06)
The Garden of Death, symphonic poem after Oscar Wilde, Op. 13 (1907–08)
Sappho, symphonic poem, Op. 14 (1909)
Flight of the Witches, symphonic poem, Op. 15 (1908–09)
Au soleil, symphonic poem, Op. 17
Fantastic Waltz, Op. 18 (1912)
Symphony No. 2 in F major, Op. 22
Suite on lute music of the 14th to 17th centuries, Op. 24 (1914)
Zodiac, suite on French themes of the 18th century, Op. 27 (1914)
Exotic Suite, Op. 29 (1915–16)
Indian Suite, Op. 42bis
Chinese Suite, No. 1, Op. 60 (1928)
Turkmenian Suite, Op. 68 (1931)
Chinese Suite, No. 2, Op. 70 (1931)
Merry-go-round, 8 Soviet dances, Op. 73 (1932)
The Soviet East, suite, Op. 75 (1932)
Red Army Rhapsody, Op. 77 (1932)
film music for Boris Barnet's Outskirts (1933)
Slavonic Rhapsody (1937)

Concertante
Violin Concerto in D minor, Op. 25 (1910–13)
Concerto for symphony orchestra and brass band (1928)
Suite on Russian Folk Themes, balalaika and accordion (1928)
Concerto for Trumpet and Orchestra, Op. 113
Piano Concerto in F-sharp minor, Op. 128

Chamber
String Quartet in A, Op. 3 (c. 1901)
Sonata in D minor for viola and piano, Op. 46 (1923); version for violin and piano (1955)
String Quartet in E minor, Op. 58 (c. 1928)
Quartet on Turkmenian Themes, for flute, oboe (English horn), clarinet, bassoon and percussion ad lib., Op. 65 (1932)
Piano Trio in A, Op. 74 (1932)
Japanese Suite for oboe, clarinet, bassoon, xylophone and piano, Op. 66a (1938)
Chinese Sketches, woodwind, Op. 78 (1938)
Quartet on American Themes, woodwind, Op. 79 (1938)

Military band
March of the Red Army, Op. 64 (1929)
Fantasy on Revolutionary Songs of the West, Op. 71 (1931)

Other
songs (including settings of Māori, Sinhalese, Indian and Japanese tunes)
folksong arrangements (including Negro and Turkmenian melodies)
piano pieces

Recordings
Sergei Vasilenko: Viola and Piano Music (Complete) - Viola Sonata, Op. 46 / Lullaby / 4 Pieces on Themes of Lute Music of the 16-17th Centuries, Op. 35 / Sleeping River / Oriental Dance, Op. 47 / Suite Zodiakus I.A.S, Op. 27 / 4 Pieces (1953) - Elena Artamonova (viola) and Nicholas Walker (piano). Toccata Classics TOCC0127, released 2011
"The Russian Connection" - Hexagon Ensemble. Etcetera Records KTC1246, released 2001 - includes Sergei Vasilenko: Quartet on Turkmenian Themes Op.65

References

Further reading 
 
A. Eaglefield-Hull (ed), A Dictionary of Modern Music and Musicians (Dent, London 1924)
Grove's Dictionary of Music and Musicians, 5th ed. (1954)

See also

External links
Brief biography and list of works

 

1872 births
1956 deaths
19th-century male musicians
20th-century composers
20th-century Russian conductors (music)
Russian male conductors (music)
20th-century Russian male musicians
Musicians from Moscow
Imperial Moscow University alumni
Moscow Conservatory alumni
Academic staff of Moscow Conservatory
People's Artists of the RSFSR
Stalin Prize winners
Recipients of the Order of the Red Banner of Labour
Composers from the Russian Empire
Conductors (music) from the Russian Empire
Pupils of Sergei Taneyev
Russian ballet composers
Russian opera composers
Russian Romantic composers
Soviet conductors (music)
Soviet male composers
Soviet music educators
Soviet opera composers
Burials at Vvedenskoye Cemetery
Soviet male classical composers